Kim Richmond (born July 24, 1940, Champaign, Illinois) is an American jazz saxophonist and composer.

Richmond played piano, clarinet, and saxophone when young, and made his professional debut in 1956. He studied at the University of Illinois in the early 1960s. He played in the U.S. Air Force big band, the Airmen of Note, while serving from 1963–67 in Washington D.C. He then moved to California and played with Stan Kenton (1967), Clare Fischer (1968), Louie Bellson (1969–72), Lalo Schifrin (1979), Bob Florence (1979), Les Brown (1989), Bill Holman (1990), Vinny Golia (1991), Johnny Mandel, Chris Walden, and Clay Jenkins.

Richmond arranged professionally from the 1960s, for Schifrin, Buddy Rich, and Ernie Watts . He founded the Kim Richmond Concert Jazz Orchestra in southern California to perform his works. Additionally, he has worked as a session musician, arranger, director, and conductor for studios and popular musicians.

Discography

As leader
 Looking In Looking Out (USA, 1990)
 Passages (Sea Breeze, 1992)
 Range (Nine Winds, 1994)
 Look at the Time (Chase, 1999)
 Ballads (Chase, 2001)
 Refractions (Origin, 2003)
 CrossWeave (Origin, 2004)
 Live at Cafe Metropol (Origin, 2007)
 Artistry (MAMA, 2013)

As sideman
With Mike Barone
 Live 2005! (Rhubarb, 2005)
 Metropole (Rhubarb, 2006)
 By Request (Rhubarb, 2007)

With Bob Florence
 Live at Concerts by the Sea (Trend, 1980)
 Westlake (Discovery, 1981)
 Soaring (Bosco, 1983)
 Magic Time (Trend, 1984)
 Trash Can City (Trend, 1987)
 State of the Art (USA, 1988)
 Treasure Chest (USA, 1990)
 Funupsmanship (MAMA, 1993)
 With All the Bells and Whistles (MAMA, 1995)
 Earth (MAMA, 1997)
 Serendipity 18 (MAMA, 1998)
 Whatever Bubbles Up (Summit, 2003)
 Eternal Licks & Grooves (MAMA, 2007)
 Legendary (MAMA, 2009)

With Vinny Golia
 Commemoration (Nine Winds, 1994)
 Portland 1996 (Nine Winds, 1997)
 The Other Bridge (Nine Winds, 2000)

With John LaBarbera
 On the Wild Side (Jazz Compass, 2003)
 Fantazm (Jazz Compass, 2005)
 Caravan (Jazz Compass, 2013)

With others
 Paul Anka, Classic Songs My Way (Universal, 2007)
 Gordon Brisker, New Beginning (Discovery, 1987)
 Dr. John, Afterglow (Blue Thumb, 1995)
 Clare Fischer, Thesaurus (Atlantic, 1969)
 Clare Fischer, Waltz (Discovery, 1988)
 Buddy Greco, Hot Nights (Applause, 1982)
 Buddy Greco, Ready for Your Love (Bainbridge, 1984)
 Les Hooper, Raisin' the Roof (Jazz Hounds, 1982)
 Stan Kenton, The Jazz Compositions of Dee Barton (Capitol, 1968)
 Sammy Nestico, Big Band Favorites of Sammy Nestico (Summit, 1998)
 John Rapson, Bing (Sound Aspects 1990)
 John Rapson, Water and Blood (Nine Winds, 2001)
 Lalo Schifrin, No One Home (Tabu, 1979)
 Chris Walden, No Bounds (Origin, 2006)
 Chris Walden, Full-On! (Origin, 2014)
 Bill Watrous/Pete Christlieb, Kindred Spirits (Summit, 2006)
 Bill Watrous/Pete Christlieb, A Beautiful Friendship (Summit, 2014)
 Phil Woods, Unheard Herd (Jazzed Media, 2003)
 Neil Young, Storytone (Reprise, 2014)

References
Thomas Owens, "Kim Richmond". Grove Jazz online

External links
Official site

American jazz saxophonists
American male saxophonists
Jazz musicians from Illinois
Living people
1940 births
21st-century American saxophonists
21st-century American male musicians
American male jazz musicians
Chris Walden Big Band members
University of Illinois alumni